Hladík (feminine: Hladíkova) is a surname. Notable people with the surname include:

 Aneta Hladíková (born 1984), Czech cyclist
 Ivan Hladík (born 1993), Slovak footballer
 Petr Hladík (born 1948), Czech cyclist
 Radim Hladík (1946–2016), Czech guitarist
 Tereza Hladíková (born 1988), Czech tennis player
 Václav Hladík (1868–1913), Czech writer, journalist and translator

Czech-language surnames